John Elkington may refer to:

John Elkington (business author) (born 1949), English businessman and author
John Elkington (British Army officer) (1830–1889), Lieutenant Governor of Guernsey
John Ford Elkington (1866–1944), son of the above and also a British Army officer
John Elkington (pilot) (1920–2019), British fighter pilot
John Simeon Colebrook Elkington (1871–1955), Australian public health advocate
John A. Elkington, American real estate developer